Kościelniki Średnie (German: Mittel-Steinkirch)  is a village in the administrative district of Gmina Leśna, within Lubań County, Lower Silesian Voivodeship, in south-western Poland. Prior to 1945 it was in Germany.

References

Villages in Lubań County